Eureka Masonic College, also known as The Little Red Schoolhouse (originally the Richland Literary Institute) in Richland, Holmes County, Mississippi, is widely known as the birthplace of the Order of the Eastern Star, created by Robert Morris.

History
The educational institution was established in 1847 by the Masonic Lodges of Holmes County, Mississippi, as the Richland Literary Institute. The lodges raised $3,400 to erect the two-story brick school building.

The Holmes County Masons hired Robert Morris away from Mount Sylvan Academy in Oxford to run their new school. In 1848, the school was renamed as the "Eureka Masonic College."

Morris was concerned that the female relatives of Masons could not share in the benefits of Freemasonry. In the winter of 1849-1850, while in Jackson, Mississippi, to recuperate from an attack of an ailment that he described as rheumatism, he focused his attention on developing a women's Masonic organization. During that winter he developed a system of degrees and other principles for that organization, and in February 1850 wrote Eastern Star's first ritual, titled The Rosary of the Eastern Star.

Morris left the school some time thereafter, moving to Masonic University in LaGrange, Kentucky. Eureka Masonic College operated until 1861, with a curriculum that never extended past the college preparatory level. During the Civil War, the school building housed the regimental headquarters for a Mississippi Infantry regiment.

Segregated public school
After the Civil War, Holmes County took over the abandoned schoolhouse for use as a segregated public school for African Americans. It continued to be used for this purpose until the 1958-1959 school year.

Restoration of building 
Following the school's closure, the schoolhouse was leased to the Order of the Eastern Star, which undertook an extensive restoration project that was finally completed in 1979. Ownership was transferred to the Order of the Eastern Star in August 1968.

Location and architecture 
There are Federal style fanlights over the doorways on its two primary facades. The first story is divided into two large classrooms, and the second story contains a single large meeting hall. At the time of its construction, it was "undoubtedly, the largest building in rural Holmes County."

See also 
 Rob Morris Home

References

University and college buildings on the National Register of Historic Places in Mississippi
Federal architecture in Mississippi
Masonic buildings completed in 1847
Holmes County, Mississippi
Defunct private universities and colleges in Mississippi
Educational institutions established in 1847
Masonic educational institutions in the United States
Order of the Eastern Star
Historically segregated African-American schools in Mississippi
1847 establishments in Mississippi
National Register of Historic Places in Holmes County, Mississippi
Schools in Holmes County, Mississippi
Former Masonic buildings in Mississippi